The BRDC C2 Championship (sometimes referred to as the British C2 Championship) was a short lived sports car racing series which ran from 1988 to 1990. The series was for Group C cars which fit into the smaller, less powerful, and cheaper C2 category. All races were run in the United Kingdom. The British Racing Drivers' Club ran the series during its lifetime.

History
Meant as a replacement for the dwindling Thundersports series, the C2 Championship would serve to bring international sports car racing seen in the World Sportscar Championship to Britain. By using the smaller C2 class only, the series was able to encourage more teams to enter not only due to the relatively low cost of the available cars, but also due to the lack of major automobile manufacturers to drive away competitors due to their dominance. This was also aided by the fact that there were already several British teams running C2 class cars on the international circuit.  

Although only seven cars would attend the opening race at Silverstone Circuit, the series was able to expand to sixteen competitors by the end of its first year. Tiga chassis dominated the season as Team Istel drivers Tim Harvey and Chris Hodgetts took the first drivers' championship.

For 1989, the series unfortunately suffered from entries as a maximum of only twelve cars were seen in some races. Tim Harvey of Team Istel again took the Class A championship in a new Spice chassis while Canadian Robbie Stirling took the Class B championship for Inside Line Racing.

1990 saw the series suffer even more as most races averaged nine competitors, some of which never even made it to the green flag. John Churchill would take the final championship for his own team as the series was cancelled soon after.

A national sports car series for Britain would not return until 1993 when the BRDC GT Championship was created. It would use production grand tourer-style sports cars instead of custom built Group C cars which had been phased out by 1992.

External links
 World Sports Prototype Racing - BRDC C2 Championship results

Group C
Sports car racing series
Auto racing series in the United Kingdom